A book is a set or collection of written, printed, illustrated, or blank sheets, made of paper, parchment, or other material, usually fastened together to hinge at one side. 

Book or Books may also refer to:

Places
 Book, Louisiana, a community in the United States
 Book's Covered Bridge, also known as Kaufman Covered Bridge, an historic wooden bridge in Jackson Township, Pennsylvania

People with the name
 Book (surname)
 Bob Books (American football) (1903–1954), American football player

Arts, entertainment, and media

Fictional characters
 Shepherd Book, a character in the Firefly television series and the following film, Serenity
 J. B. Books, a character in the film The Shootist

Music
 The Books, an American band
 Books (EP), a 2004 Extended Play music recording by Belle & Sebastian
 "Book", a 2015 song by Chon from Grow
 Book (album), a 2021 album by They Might Be Giants

Other arts, entertainment, and media
 Book (musical theatre), the spoken dialogue of a stage musical
 Book, a 1997 memoir by Whoopi Goldberg
 "Book 'em, Danno!", Det. Capt. Steve McGarrett's catchphrase on the Hawaii Five-O (1968 TV series)

Other uses
 Book (graph theory), a split graph consisting of p triangles sharing a common edge
 Book (wagering), a set of odds for the possible outcomes in betting
 Book, a synonym for the act of making a reservation with a hospitality vendor (e.g., a table reservation or travel reservation) or entertainment act
 Book, to arrest someone, i.e., apprehend and take them into custody
 Book lung, a respiratory organ in some arachnids
 Book of Life, the book in which God, on Rosh Hashana, writes the names of those who will live another year
 Book wallpaper, in wallpaper installation, the step that activates the paste
 Books, accounting and financial records

See also
 Bookie
 Booking (disambiguation)
 Cook the Books (TV program)
 Cook the Books
 Good book (disambiguation)
 The Book (disambiguation)